Trifurcula corleyi is a moth of the family Nepticulidae. It is found in central and southern Spain (in the provinces of Ávila, Cuenca, Málaga, and Toledo) and Portugal.

The wingspan is 4-5.2 mm.

External links
Seven New Species Of The Subgenus Glaucolepis Braun From Southern Europe (Lepidoptera: Nepticulidae, Trifurcula)

Nepticulidae
Moths of Europe
Moths described in 2007